Mylothris erlangeri is a butterfly in the family Pieridae. It is found in southern Ethiopia.

References

Seitz, A. Die Gross-Schmetterlinge der Erde 13: Die Afrikanischen Tagfalter. Plate XIII 12

Butterflies described in 1902
Pierini
Endemic fauna of Ethiopia
Butterflies of Africa